Crispin Daniel Bonham-Carter (born 23 September 1969 in Colchester, Essex) is an English actor, theatre director, and educator. He was appointed Assistant Head at the Queen Elizabeth's School, Barnet, in 2019. His best known acting role is that of Mr. Bingley in the 1995 television miniseries Pride and Prejudice.  His work directing young actors at LAMDA, the Guildhall and the Royal Central School of Speech and Drama and working at the National Youth Theatre inspired him to train as a teacher. He is a member of the Bonham Carter family.

Careers

Bonham-Carter starred alongside Ewan McGregor in the 1993 BBC period drama Scarlet and Black, playing Rachel Weisz's suitor. He starred in the TV sitcom Honey for Tea in 1994. He appeared as Mr Bingley in the 1995 BBC adaptation of Pride and Prejudice, alongside Colin Firth. He played a small role in Bridget Jones's Diary in 2001. That same year, he appeared on Season 4 of Absolutely Fabulous as a gardener named Jago Balfour, who was commissioned to redesign the back garden.

Bonham trained as a teacher from 2007 to 2008, and then worked for 10 years teaching English and Classics at Alexandra Park School, a comprehensive school in north London. In 2019, he was appointed an Assistant Head at Queen Elizabeth's School, Barnet—his "dream job".

Personal life
Bonham-Carter is the son of Peter Bonham-Carter and Clodagh Greenwood, and the grandson of Rear Admiral Sir Christopher Bonham-Carter. He is a third cousin once removed of actress Helena Bonham Carter and her brother, Edward.

Bonham-Carter is married to Katherine Julian Dawnay. They have four sons.

He was educated at Stancliffe Hall prep school in Derbyshire then Glenalmond College, and graduated in 1992 from the University of St Andrews with a degree in classics. In 2011, he represented his former university in a special series of University Challenge.

Filmography

Music video

References

External links

Crispin Bonham-Carter Page
 Crispin Bonham-Carter BFI
 Crispin Bonham-Carter at Queen Elizabeth's School

1969 births
People educated at Glenalmond College
Alumni of the University of St Andrews
English male film actors
People from Colchester
Male actors from Essex
Living people
20th-century English male actors
21st-century English male actors
People from Muswell Hill
Crispin
Teachers of English
Schoolteachers from Sussex